Han Chao (Chinese: 韩超; born 31 January 1989) is a Chinese professional footballer who currently plays for Henan Oriental Classic.

Club career
In 2008, Han Chao started his professional footballer career with Shanghai Dongya in the China League One.

In February 2010, Han transferred to China League One side Nanjing Yoyo.

In July 2011, Han transferred to Chinese Super League side Henan Jianye on a free transfer. He would eventually make his league debut for Henan on 28 September 2012 in a game against Shanghai Shenhua, coming on as a substitute for Huang Xiyang in the 79th minute.

Career statistics 
Statistics accurate as of match played 31 December 2020.

Honours

Club
Henan Jianye
China League One: 2013

References

External links

1989 births
Living people
Chinese footballers
Footballers from Henan
Shanghai Port F.C. players
Nanjing Yoyo players
Henan Songshan Longmen F.C. players
Kunshan F.C. players
Chinese Super League players
China League One players
China League Two players
Association football defenders